Wikibase is a set of MediaWiki extensions for working with versioned semi-structured data in a central repository based upon JSON instead of the unstructured data of MediaWiki wikitext. Its primary components are the Wikibase Repository, an extension for storing and managing data, and the Wikibase Client which allows for the retrieval and embedding of structured data from a wikibase repository.

The data model for Wikibase links consists of "entities" which include individual "items", labels or identifier to describe them (potentially in multiple languages), and semantic statements that attribute "properties" to the item. These properties may either be other items within the database, or textual information.

Wikibase has a JavaScript-based user interface, and provides exports of all or subsets of data in many formats. Projects using it include Wikidata, Wikimedia Commons, Europeana's Eagle Project, Lingua Libre, and the OpenStreetMap wiki.

See also 
 Document-oriented database
 Entity–attribute–value model (EAV)
 Attribute (computing)
 Property (programming)
 Semantic wiki
 Semantic MediaWiki
 Triplestore

References

External links 
 
Wikibase Repository extension for MediaWiki
Wikikbase Client extension for MediaWiki

MediaWiki extensions
Wikidata